The Prairie County Courthouse is a historic courthouse building in  DeValls Bluff, Arkansas. DeValls Bluff is, is one of two county seatss in Prairie County; the other is Des Arc, which also has a courthouse.

The courthouse in DeValls Bluff is located at the junction of Magnolia and Prairie Streets, and is a vernacular two story brick building constructed in 1939 with funding assistance from the Works Progress Administration. The building was listed on the National Register of Historic Places in 1995.

See also
National Register of Historic Places listings in Prairie County, Arkansas

References

County courthouses in Arkansas
Courthouses on the National Register of Historic Places in Arkansas
Government buildings completed in 1939
Buildings and structures in Prairie County, Arkansas
National Register of Historic Places in Prairie County, Arkansas
1939 establishments in Arkansas